The Modular Chemical Descriptor Language (MCDL) is a method for representing of molecular structures and pertinent molecular information using linear descriptors. MCDL files are designed for cross-platform transfer and manipulation of compound-specific chemical data. They consist of sets of unique information (fragments, connections) and nonunique information (coordinates, ID numbers, spectra, physical-chemical properties). The nonunique portion of the descriptor can be customized, thus providing end-user flexibility. Unique representation of atom and double bond stereochemistry is contrived as separate modules.

Software implementation
Modular Chemical Descriptor Language is currently implemented in several software packages. A JAVA-based MCDL editor with intelligent generation of 2D coordinates is available as open source software under GPL. MCDL translator is also included in Open Babel starting from version 2.3.1.

See also
Chemical file format

References

Chemical file formats